Gerald is an unincorporated community in Tobin Township, Perry County, in the U.S. state of Indiana.

History
A post office was established at Gerald in 1905, and remained in operation until it was discontinued in 1955.

Notable person
 Andrew Jacobs (1906-1992), Democratic Congressman

References

External links
 Gerald, Indiana Community Profile

Unincorporated communities in Perry County, Indiana
Unincorporated communities in Indiana